Zayan (Zayan FM) is a Malaysian Malay language radio station operated by Astro Radio Sdn. Bhd. The radio station went on air on 2 October 2017. Its frequencies were formerly used by The Star's former radio station, Red FM. The radio station targets Muslim listeners aged 18–35 and plays music from local and international artists, as well as mainly Islamic-related content. It is the first Islamic radio station operated by Astro Radio.

Notable announcers 
 Mawi

Frequency 

 
(Via satellite TV)
 Astro (television): Channel 876

References

External links 
 

2017 establishments in Malaysia
Radio stations established in 2017
Radio stations in Malaysia
Malay-language radio stations